The Internationaux de Tennis de Blois is a tennis tournament held in Blois, France since 2013. The event is part of the ATP Challenger Tour and is played on clay courts.

Past finals

Singles

Doubles

References

External links
Official website

 
ATP Challenger Tour
Tennis tournaments in France
Clay court tennis tournaments
Sport in Blois
Recurring sporting events established in 2013